There are 12 stadiums in use by Eastern League (EL) baseball teams. The oldest is FirstEnergy Stadium (1951) in Reading, Pennsylvania, home of the Reading Fightin Phils. The newest is Dunkin' Park (2017) in Hartford, Connecticut, home of the Hartford Yard Goats. One stadium was built in the 1950s, two in the 1980s, seven in the 1990s, one in the 2000s, and one in the 2010s. The highest seating capacity is 10,000 at Prince George's Stadium in Bowie, Maryland, where the Bowie Baysox play. The lowest capacity is 6,000 at UPMC Park in Erie, Pennsylvania, where the Erie SeaWolves play.  All stadiums use a grass surface.

Since its founding, there have been 69 stadiums located among 53 municipalities used by the league, including the period when the EL was known as the New York–Pennsylvania League from 1923 to 1937. Of the stadiums with known opening dates, the oldest to have hosted EL games was Pynchon Park (1853), home of the Springfield Nationals, Springfield Rifles, and Springfield Giants; Dunkin' Park is also the newest of all stadiums to host EL games. The highest known seating capacity was 45,000 at War Memorial Stadium, the Buffalo Bisons home, though it was actually designed for football. The highest capacity of a stadium designed for baseball was 24,167 at Roosevelt Stadium, where the Jersey City Indians and Jersey City A's played their home games. The stadium with the lowest known capacity was Bleecker Stadium, home of the Albany-Colonie A's, which seated only 2000.

Active stadiums
{|class="wikitable sortable plainrowheaders"
|-
!Name
!Team
!City
!State
!Opened
!data-sort-type="number"|Capacity
!class="unsortable"|Ref.
|-
!scope="row"|Canal Park
|Akron RubberDucks
|Akron
|Ohio
|1997
|align="right"|7,630
|
|-
!scope="row"|
|Richmond Flying Squirrels
|Richmond
|Virginia
|1985
|align="right"|9,560
|
|-
!scope="row"|Dunkin' Park
|Hartford Yard Goats
|Hartford
|Connecticut
|2017
|align="right"|6,121
|
|-
!scope="row"|FirstEnergy Stadium
|Reading Fightin Phils
|Reading
|Pennsylvania
|1951
|align="right"|9,000
|
|-
!scope="row"|FNB Field
|Harrisburg Senators
|Harrisburg
|Pennsylvania
|1987
|align="right"|6,187
|
|-
!scope="row"|Hadlock Field
|Portland Sea Dogs
|Portland
|Maine
|1994
|align="right"|7,368
|
|-
!scope="row"|Mirabito Stadium
|Binghamton Rumble Ponies
|Binghamton
|New York
|1992
|align="right"|6,012
|
|-
!scope="row"|Delta Dental Stadium
|New Hampshire Fisher Cats
|Manchester
|New Hampshire
|2005
|align="right"|6,500
|
|-
!scope="row"|Peoples Natural Gas Field
|Altoona Curve
|Altoona
|Pennsylvania
|1999
|align="right"|7,210
|
|-
!scope="row"|Prince George's Stadium
|Bowie Baysox
|Bowie
|Maryland
|1994
|align="right"|10,000
|
|-
!scope="row"|TD Bank Ballpark
|Somerset Patriots
|Bridgewater
|New Jersey
|1999
|align="right"|6,100
|
|-
!scope="row"|UPMC Park
|Erie SeaWolves
|Erie
|Pennsylvania
|1995
|align="right"|6,000
|
|}

Map

Gallery

Former stadiums

Map

See also

List of Double-A baseball stadiums
List of Southern League stadiums
List of Texas League stadiums
List of Eastern League teams

Notes

References

External links

Digitalballparks.com's Photographic history of all Eastern League Ballparks Since 1923

Eastern League
Eastern League stadiums